King's Highway 60, commonly referred to as Highway 60, is a provincially maintained highway in the Canadian province of Ontario. The  highway serves as the primary corridor through Algonquin Provincial Park, where it is dedicated as the Frank McDougall Parkway. East of Algonquin Park, the route serves east–west traffic in the highlands of central Ontario. It begins at Highway 11 in Huntsville and ends at Highway 17 near Renfrew.

Highway 60 was designated in 1937 between Huntsville and Lake Dore, near where it met Highway 41. During the 1940s, the route shared a common termini with Highway 41 at Golden Lake. When Highway 41 was extended north to Pembroke in 1957, Highway 60 was routed along it between Golden Lake and Eganville. It was extended east to Highway 17 in downtown Renfrew circa 1961. It was extended further east when Highway 17 was rerouted around Renfrew in 1977, establishing the current route.

Route description 

Highway 60 begins at an interchange with Highway 11 in Huntsville. It crosses through central Ontario in a generally east–west orientation. The triangle-shaped area bounded by Highways 11, 17 and 60 is largely uninhabited wilderness dotted with lakes and muskeg.

East of Huntsville, Highway 60 meanders east then south through the northeastern corner of Muskoka District, meeting Highway 35 at Dwight. It travels northeast from there, briefly passing through Haliburton County before crossing into Nipissing District and entering Algonquin Park.
An Ontario Parks visitor's permit is not required to drive through Algonquin Park. However, one is required for the use of any trails, campgrounds, the Visitor Centre, or similar facilities within the park boundary. Moose and deer are very common through Algonquin, especially at night and in the morning, and present a major driving hazard.
The  journey through Algonquin Park offers some of the most famous scenery in Canada, including vistas of numerous lakes and geological formations that have been captured in the arts of Group of Seven painter Tom Thomson among others. The park is considered the most important place in Canada for biological and environmental research.

Highway 60 exits the park in the Township of South Algonquin travelling south into Whitney, curving east and intersecting Highway 127. Beyond Highway 127, it passes through the Madawaska Highlands, following the historic Opeongo Line. It passes through Madawaska, encountering Secondary Highway 523, then curves southeast into Renfrew County. The route enters Barry's Bay, where it turns east and meets the southern leg of former Highway 62, where a concurrency with it began prior to 1998. After passing through Wilno, the route curves northeast around Killaloe, intersecting the northern leg of former Highway 62 and Highway 512.

Continuing around Golden Lake and through the village of the same name, Highway 60 travels southeast into the Ottawa Valley towards Eganville, where it has a  concurrency with Highway 41. For the remainder of the route, the highway travels near the Bonnechere River. It continues east then south to Douglas, where drivers must turn northeast to continue along the highway. Highway 60 slowly curves southeast before entering the town of Renfrew, where it is known as Stewart Street, Bridge Street, Raglan Street South, Veterans Memorial Boulevard and O'Brien Road. It encounters the eastern terminus of Highway 132 before curving east to end at Highway 17 on the outskirts of the town.

History 

Highway 60 was established in 1937, when the Department of Northern Development was amalgamated by the Department of Highways (DHO). The section of the route through Nipissing District (through Algonquin Park) was assumed by the DHO on September22, followed by the section through Renfrew County on September29, and finally the section through Muskoka District on October6. Highway 41 travelled along the portion of what is now Highway 60 between Eganville and Golden Lake.

On April 11, 1957, the Eganville–Pembroke Road was assumed as an extension of Highway 41, with the former portion of the route between Eganville and Golden Lake being renumbered as part of Highway 60.
Highway 60 was extended to Highway 17 near Rosebank, north of Renfrew, circa 1961.
With the construction of the Renfrew Bypass, which began in June 1974,
and was completed in 1977,
the section of Highway 17 between O'Brien Road east of Renfrew and Haley Road north of Haley Station was renumbered as an extension of Highway 60, establishing the current route of the highway.

In 1976, the section through Algonquin Park was dedicated in honour of the 35 years of service by Frank Archibald MacDougall: ten years as park superintendent and 25 as Deputy Minister of Lands and Forests. It is signed as the Frank MacDougall Parkway.

Major intersections

References

External links 

060
Transport in Huntsville, Ontario